Hili Archaeological Park is the location of a Bronze Age site in Al Ain, Emirate of Abu Dhabi, the United Arab Emirates.

Description and history 
Hili is the largest Bronze Age site in the UAE and dates from the 3rd millennium BCE. Other remains include settlements, tombs, and a falaj dating from the Iron Age. Some of the site is located outside the park in a protected area. Finds from the site can be seen in the Al Ain National Museum in central Al Ain. The tombs belong to the Umm al-Nar culture.

In May 2019 the Abu Dhabi Department of Culture & Tourism reported that fingerprints about 3000 years old were found at Hili II. They apparently belonged to craftsmen who constructed a wall at the site.

See also 
 Al Ain Oasis
 Tawam (region)
 Al-Buraimi
 Archaeological Sites of Bat, Al-Khutm and Al-Ayn
 Hafit period
 Ibri
 List of Ancient Settlements in the UAE
 Qattara Oasis
 Rumailah, UAE

References 

Hili, Al-Ain
Tourist attractions in Al Ain
Archaeological sites in the United Arab Emirates
History of the Emirate of Abu Dhabi
Parks in the United Arab Emirates
World Heritage Sites in the United Arab Emirates
Archaeological parks
Archaeology of the United Arab Emirates